The eighth Sarawak state election was held on Thursday, 27 September 2001 with nomination date on Tuesday, 18 September 2001. The state assembly was supposed to be expired on 18 November 2001 but it was dissolved by the governor of Sarawak 2 months earlier on 3 September 2001.

The election saw 815,932 citizens eligible to vote but only 67.01% of the total voters or 546,285 voters had turned up to vote in this election.

There were 171 candidates pursuing for 62 state seats in Sarawak. Sarawak Barisan Nasional (National Front) won 60 out of 62 seats while the remaining two seats were won by Democratic Action Party (DAP) and independent respectively.

Results

Summary

Results by constituency
4 state seats were won unopposed by Sarawak National Front on the nomination day. 
They were:

N11. Batu Kawah – Alfred Yap Chin Loi by Sarawak United Peoples' Party (SUPP)

N25. Batang Ai – Dublin Unting anak Ingkot by Sarawak Dayak People's Party (PBDS)

N49. Katibas – Ambrose Blikau by United Traditional Bumiputera Party (PBB)

N62. Ba'kelalan – Dr Judson Tagal by Sarawak National Party (SNAP)

There were two election petitions filed to the Sarawak high court for N48 Pelagus and N60 Limbang constituency respectively after the election.

The full list of representatives is shown below:

References 

Sarawak state elections
Sarawak
Sarawak